Katrina Jacqueline Rivera Guillou (born December 19, 1993) is a footballer who plays as an attacking midfielder for Swedish Damallsvenskan club Piteå IF. Born in the United States, she represents the Philippines women's national team. She can also play as a forward.

Early life and education
Guillou was born to a Filipino mother, Lorna (née Rivera), and a French father, Yves Guillou, in Washington, D.C., the United States. A native of Fort Washington, Maryland, she attended the Bishop Ireton High School in Virginia for her secondary studies and later the University of North Carolina Wilmington (UNCW) for her collegiate studies.

College career
From 2012 to 2015, Guillou played for the UNC Wilmington Seahawks women's soccer (football) team which competes in the Colonial Athletic Association Division 1. In her senior year, she helped the Seahawks secure an at-large berth for the NCAA Division I.

Club career
After graduating from UNCW, Guillou signed up to play for Finnish club Oulu Nice Soccer in 2016. She would move to Sweden to play for Morön BK and in December 2020 switch to Piteå IF.

International career
When she was still a college player, her coach would convince her to join a national team. Two years prior to the Asian Cup, she sent the Philippine Football Federation a highlight reel of her earlier part of her stint in Sweden which led to her securing a Philippine passport in order for her to be able to play for the national team.

Philippines
Guillou made her first cap for the Philippines in the national team's 1–0 win against Thailand at the 2022 AFC Women's Asian Cup. In that same tournament, she scored her first international goal for the Philippines in their final group match, a 6–0 win against Indonesia. On April 11, 2022, Guillou scored her first international hat-trick in a friendly against Fiji, which the Philippines won 8–0.

International goals

Honours

International

Philippines 

 AFF Women's Championship: 2022

References

1993 births
Living people
Citizens of the Philippines through descent
Filipino women's footballers
Women's association football midfielders
Women's association football forwards
Piteå IF (women) players
Kansallinen Liiga players
Elitettan players
Damallsvenskan players
Philippines women's international footballers
Filipino expatriate footballers
Filipino expatriates in Finland
Expatriate women's footballers in Finland
Filipino expatriate sportspeople in Sweden
Expatriate women's footballers in Sweden
Filipino people of French descent
Soccer players from Washington, D.C.
People from Fort Washington, Maryland
Sportspeople from the Washington metropolitan area
Soccer players from Maryland
American women's soccer players
UNC Wilmington Seahawks women's soccer players
American expatriate women's soccer players
American expatriate sportspeople in Sweden
American expatriate sportspeople in Finland
American people of French descent
American sportspeople of Filipino descent